Wyola, Arkansas is an unincorporated community in Crawford Township, Washington County, Arkansas, United States. It is located on Arkansas Highway 74, south of Arnett and east of Brentwood.

References

Unincorporated communities in Washington County, Arkansas
Unincorporated communities in Arkansas